Banner Township, Arkansas may refer to:

 Banner Township, Ashley County, Arkansas
 Banner Township, Saline County, Arkansas

See also 
 List of townships in Arkansas
 Banner Township (disambiguation)

Arkansas township disambiguation pages